Seung-jae is a Korean masculine given name. Its meaning differs based on the hanja with which it is written. There are 15 hanja with the reading "seung" and 20 hanja with the reading "jae" on the South Korean government's official list of hanja which may be used in given names.

People with this name include:
Woo Seung-jae (born 1986), South Korean wrestler
Seo Seung-jae (born 1997), South Korean badminton player
Lee Seung-jae (speed skater) (born 1982), South Korean speed skater who represented South Korea at the 2002 Winter Olympics

Fictional characters with this name include:
Kang Seung-jae, character played by Yoon Kye-sang in 2004 South Korean television series My 19 Year Old Sister-in-Law
Lee Seung-jae, character played by Oh Jung-se in 2013 South Korean film How to Use Guys with Secret Tips
Mo Seung-jae, character played by Yeon Jung-hoon in 2017 South Korean television series Man to Man

See also
List of Korean given names

References

Korean masculine given names